Karma (born 6 June 1990) is a Bhutanese recurve archer from Trashiyangtse in eastern Bhutan and lives at Thimphu also in Bhutan.

Career 

Like with other Bhutanese, Karma is a mononymous person who goes by a single name. Being interested in sports, Karma took up archery in April 2009. She could have been a runner if not archery came first. Her first appearance as an international competitor was in 2012 and by 2018, she already competed in more than eight international events.

She competed in the individual recurve event and the team recurve event at the 2013 and 2015 World Archery Championships in Copenhagen, Denmark and she represented Bhutan at the 2016 Summer Olympics in Rio de Janeiro as wildcard. She was defeated in the first round by Tuiana Dashidorzhieva of Russia. Karma was the flag bearer for Bhutan during the Parade of Nations.

Karma took part in the 2020 Summer Olympics in 2021 in Tokyo, and was again a flag-bearer for Bhutan in the Parade of Nations during the opening ceremony. She is also the very first athlete from Bhutan who got a place in the quota allocation system of the Olympics in any sport and the first female from Bhutan who qualified for the games. While practicing for the Tokyo Olympics in May 2021, Karma was able to do a "Robin Hood" shot, which is an arrow being fired into another arrow that is already in the target board, splitting it, just like as told in the stories of the legendary Robin Hood. The odds in doing the shot is 1 in 3,000.

She was able to land a spot at the 2020 Summer Olympics in Tokyo after qualifying through Asian championships in 2018 at Bangkok, Thailand. Eventually, her journey ends in the Tokyo Olympics when she lost to Deepika Kumari of India at 6-0 in round of 64. Despite losing to Kumari, she is satisfied in giving her best and opined that qualifying for the Tokyo Olympics was her biggest dreams as well as an achievement for her country.

References

External links
 
 

Bhutanese female archers
Living people
People from Trashiyangtse District
1990 births
Olympic archers of Bhutan
Archers at the 2016 Summer Olympics
Archers at the 2018 Asian Games
Asian Games competitors for Bhutan
Archers at the 2020 Summer Olympics
South Asian Games medalists in archery